The Sea organ is an architectural sound art object located in Zadar, Croatia and an experimental musical instrument, which plays music by way of sea waves and tubes located underneath a set of large marble steps.

History
Chaotic reconstruction work was undertaken to repair the devastation Zadar suffered in the Second World War. The frantic reconstruction turned much of the sea front into an unbroken, monotonous concrete wall.

The device was made by the architect Nikola Bašić as part of the project to redesign the new city coast (Nova rive) and the site was opened to the public on 15 April 2005. The waves interact with the organ and create somewhat random but harmonic sounds.

The Sea Organ has drawn tourists and locals alike. White marble steps leading down to the water were built later. Concealed under these steps, which both protect and invite, is a system of polyethylene tubes and a resonating cavity.

In 2006, the Sea Organ was awarded with the prize ex-aequo of the fourth edition of the European Prize for Urban Public Space.

See also
List of Croatian inventions and discoveries
Wave Organ (in San Francisco, California, USA)
Blackpool High Tide Organ (in Blackpool, England, UK)
Chillida's Comb of the Wind (in San Sebastián / Donostia, Basque Country, Spain)
Water organ or Hydraulis
Hydraulophone

References

External links

"Sea organ, Zadar, Croatia", SonicWonders.org (sound and video)
"Sea Organ - musical instrument played by the sea", OddMusic.com.
"Sea organ photo pool", Flickr.com.
Sea organ, prize ex-aequo of the fourth edition of the European Prize for Urban Public Space, PublicSpace.org.
"Sea organ music, Zadar, Croatia", free-stock-music.com (sound)
"Sea organ binaural recording music, Zadar, Croatia", soundcloud.com (sound)

Hydraulophones
Organs (music)
Sound sculptures
Outdoor sculptures
Installation art works
Buildings and structures in Zadar
Croatian musical instruments
Buildings and structures in Zadar County
Urban public parks
Buildings and structures completed in 2005
2005 establishments in Croatia
Tourist attractions in Zadar
Croatian inventions